KTBU (channel 55) is a television station licensed to Conroe, Texas, United States, broadcasting the digital multicast network Quest to the Houston area. It is owned and operated by Tegna Inc. alongside CBS affiliate KHOU (channel 11). Both stations share studios on Westheimer Road near Uptown Houston, while KTBU's transmitter is located near Missouri City, in unincorporated northeastern Fort Bend County. Previously, KTBU maintained separate facilities on Old Katy Road in the northwest side of Houston, while the KHOU studios only housed KTBU's master control and some internal operations.

History

The station first signed on the air on July 15, 1998 from facilities located on Old Katy Road near Memorial Park in northwest Houston, and was originally owned by Charles Dowen Johnson's Humanity Interested Media (alongside KVQT-LD) and then by the Osteen family of Lakewood Church fame. The station launched as an independent station with a general entertainment format including classic and syndicated television series, movies and sports, plus a slate of locally produced shows focusing on sports, history and other topics of interest to Houstonians.

KTBU was later purchased by the Houston-based USFR Media Group, at which time the station moved from its original studios on Old Katy Road to a purpose-built facility on Equity Drive in northwest Houston previously built for the ill-fated News 24 Houston cable news channel, and changed its on-air moniker to "Houston's 55".

In May 2011, the station was sold to the Spanish Broadcasting System for $16 million. Upon the completion of the sale, KTBU dropped all local and national syndicated programs and joined SBS' Mega TV network.

On January 21, 2020, Tegna Inc. agreed to acquire KTBU for $15 million. The sale was completed on March 24, 2020, making KTBU a sister station to Tegna's CBS affiliate KHOU. Three days later, KTBU's main channel flipped to the Tegna-owned Quest multicast network, and eventually KTBU's operations were moved into KHOU's studios near Uptown Houston.

Upon becoming a Tegna property, it was announced that KTBU would take over as the official local television partner of Major League Soccer's Houston Dynamo. KTBU may air CBS network programming should it be preempted by KHOU for long-form breaking news or severe weather coverage or other special programming. Its main role however, is serving as a UHF rebroadcaster for KHOU via its DT11 subchannel, allowing full-market access to the station for viewers who only have a UHF antenna.

On February 22, 2022, Tegna announced that it would be acquired by Standard General and Apollo Global Management for $5.4 billion. As a part of the deal, KTBU and KHOU, along with their Austin sister station KVUE and Dallas sister stations WFAA and KMPX, would be resold to Cox Media Group.

Technical information

Subchannels
The station's digital signal is multiplexed:

Analog-to-digital conversion
KTBU discontinued regular programming on its analog signal, over UHF channel 55, on June 12, 2009, as part of the federally mandated transition from analog to digital television. The station's digital signal remained on its pre-transition UHF channel 42, using PSIP to display KTBU's virtual channel as 55 on digital television receivers, which was among the high band UHF channels (52-69) that were removed from broadcasting use as a result of the transition.

See also

 Channel 33 digital TV stations in the United States
 Channel 55 virtual TV stations in the United States

References

External links
 FCC Public Inspection File: KTBU
 Technical and ownership information for KTBU at RabbitEars

Television channels and stations established in 1999
1999 establishments in Texas
Tegna Inc.
TBU
Conroe, Texas
Quest (American TV network) affiliates
Twist (TV network) affiliates
Vietnamese-language television stations in Texas